Davao Occidental, officially the Province of Davao Occidental, is a province in the Philippines located in the Davao Region in Mindanao. Its capital is the municipality of Malita. To the east lies Davao Gulf. It also shares a maritime border with the Indonesian province of North Sulawesi to the south.

History
What is now Davao Occidental was once a part of the now-defunct Davao Province which encompasses the entirety of present-day Davao Region. Section 1 of Philippine Commission Act No. 164 dated December 10, 1904 indicated that much of its area as far as what is now Malita once belonged to the municipality of Santa Cruz. The original chief inhabitants of the area were the indigenous Lumad tribes including the Matigsalugs and Tagakaulos. Around the early 1900s onward, migrants from Luzon and the Visayas settled in the area, many of whom intermarried with the indigenous people; as decades progressed the descendants of the migrants became the majority of the population.

The municipality of Malita was founded on November 13, 1936 per Proclamation No. 64 signed by President Manuel Quezon. It was the first town to be established in the area of what is now Davao Occidental and would later serve as its provincial capital. More towns in the area are established later: Trinidad (now Jose Abad Santos) in 1948, Sta Maria in 1968, Don Marcelino in 1979, and Sarangani in 1980.

On May 8, 1967, Davao Province was split into three provinces, one of them being Davao del Sur which included the municipalities of what would later comprise Davao Occidental.

Foundation

Davao Occidental was created through Republic Act 10360 enacted on July 23, 2013, comprising five of the eight municipalities that constitute the 2nd district of Davao del Sur. RA 10360 was passed by the House of Representatives and Senate on November 28, 2012, and December 5, 2012, respectively, and signed by President Benigno Aquino III on January 14, 2013. A plebiscite was held on October 28, 2013, along with the barangay elections and the majority of votes cast were "Yes", ratifying the province.

The motive of creating the province was to boost the economic condition and social progress of the municipalities. Senator Bongbong Marcos, who sponsored the creation of Davao Occidental, said that the distances of Digos, Davao del Sur's provincial capital, to other municipalities in the second Congressional District are far-off that impairs the effective delivery of basic services, as well as the access to government offices. However, Davao del Sur Representative Marc Douglas Cagas considered the creation of the province as nothing more than gerrymandering and political convenience.

Government officials of Davao del Sur with assistance from the Department of the Interior and Local Government exercised jurisdiction over the Davao Occidental until the elected local officials of the 2016 elections assumed office.

Geography
Davao Occidental covers a total area of  occupying the southwestern tip of the Davao Region in Mindanao. The province is bordered on the northwest by Davao del Sur; west by Sarangani and northeast by Davao Gulf.

The topography of Davao Occidental is hilly, rugged and sloping, with nearly the whole province consisting of mountains. Its eastern shoreline consists of cliffs and beaches with hills immediately on their backs. Coconut trees and hardwood trees mostly dominate the provincial mainland.

Government
The province of Davao Occidental is governed by a governor and a vice governor. The whole province is a lone congressional legislative district. The municipality of Malita, the largest and most populous in the province, serves as the provincial capital and the place where the provincial officials of Davao Occidental convene.

Administrative divisions
The province comprises 5 municipalities.

Demographics

The population mostly consists of people whose ancestors originate from the migrants from Visayan Islands and Luzon. The Lumad natives only form a small part of the population and live in the more mountainous and forested areas of the province.

Economy

The main industries in Davao Occidental are aquaculture and agriculture. Economic produce in the province include fish, bananas and coconuts which are then exported to several major cities within southern Mindanao, including Davao City. Rice farms are only limited to the few flat lands in the province due to its mountainous and thickly forested nature.

The capital town of Malita is the province's main commercial hub.

Tourism has started to gain traction in the province, with potential tourist destinations mostly concentrated in the province's coastal beaches and the Sarangani and Balut islands in the south.

Transportation
Davao Occidental is served by only one partially-coastal highway that traverses the whole length of the provincial mainland from north to south, and could only be accessed by going through the road crossings in Sulop in Davao del Sur province and, farther ahead, in the city of General Santos. Buses, jeepneys and passenger vans that originate from and serve the cities of Davao and Digos are the main primary modes of transportation in the province. Boats serve as the primary maritime mode of transportation for coastal areas not yet accessible by roads and the island municipality of Sarangani.

See also
 Davao del Sur
 2016 Davao Occidental local elections

References

External links

 
 
 Republic Act No. 10360: "Charter of the Province of Davao Occidental"

 
Provinces of the Philippines
Provinces of the Davao Region
States and territories established in 2013
2013 establishments in the Philippines